Cambusavie platform formerly served Cambusavie in Sutherland, Scotland.

History
The station was opened in 1902. It was a request stop only. The station was on the Dornoch Light Railway, a branch railway which was later incorporated into the London, Midland and Scottish Railway (in 1923) and the Scottish Region of British Railways in 1948.

The station closed on 13 June 1960.

Other stations on the branch line
 The Mound - junction - line still open.
 Skelbo
 Embo
 Dornoch

See also 
 List of closed railway stations in Britain

References

External links
 Disused stations
 Cambusavie Platform (marked as Halt) on navigable 1947 map

Disused railway stations in Sutherland
Former Highland Railway stations
Railway stations in Great Britain opened in 1902
Railway stations in Great Britain closed in 1960